Harry Albert Sieben II (August 23, 1914 - April 25, 1979) was a Minnesota politician and member of the Sieben political family.

Early life
Sieben was born on August 23, 1914 in Hastings, Minnesota, to father, Harry Albert Sieben (1890-1945), a 1911 graduate of the University of Chicago, and mother, Irene H. Buckley Sieben (1891-1982), a 1911 graduate of the University of Minnesota. The Sieben family originally arrived in the United States from Firmenich, near Cologne, Germany, in the then-Kingdom of Prussia, in 1847.

Sieben's was born into a political family. His father was mayor of Hastings from 1922 to 1926, as was his grandfather, J. George Sieben, who served three terms as mayor, while also serving on the city council for twelve years. His mother was a delegate to the Democratic National Convention in 1948. 

Sieben was a graduate of the University of Minnesota and later William Mitchell College of Law.

Before his career in law and government, Sieben managed his family's drug store, which was founded by his grandfather in 1885. Sieben is also a veteran of World War II, serving at the bomber modification center at Holman Field in St. Paul.

Sieben married his wife, the former Mary Luger, in April 1940, in Minneapolis.

Political career
Sieben was a long-time member of the Minnesota Democratic–Farmer–Labor Party (DFL) and active in local and state politics for over thirty years. 

In addition to the political activity of his father and grandfather in Hastings, Sieben's own introduction to politics came during Hubert Humphrey's successful 1948 bid for US Senate.

In 1950, Sieben ran for Minnesota's 2nd Congressional District of the US Congress, against incumbent since 1941 Joseph O'Hara. Sieben supported the Marshall Plan and providing military assistance to Europe and Asia, including Korea. Sieben ultimately lost 69,304 to 46,452.

In February 1951, he was also appointed acting director of the Office of Price Stabilization in Minnesota after being recommended for it by then-Senator Hubert Humphrey. 

In 1954, Sieben again ran for US Congress in the 2nd District. A highlight of Sieben's campaign was a fundraising dinner for 700 people in Mankato with sitting Senator Hubert Humphrey at $5 per plate.

In January 1955, Minnesota Governor Orville Freeman appointed Sieben as liquor control commissioner. In 1957, Governor Freeman appointed Sieben as the Minnesota highway safety director, a role in which he served for four years. Sieben was also a confidante of Governor Karl Rolvaag. 

He was appointed as U.S. Marshal for Minnesota by President John F. Kennedy on May 1, 1961.

Sieben stepped down from US Marshal position in the summer of 1962 to become the regional director of the Small Business Administration for Minnesota, Nort and South Dakota, and northern Wisconsin. 

In 1966, at the age of 52, he graduated from William Mitchell College of Law and worked as a lawyer. In 1968, Sieben was elected president of the Twin Cities chapter of the Federal Bar Association. 

From 1971 until his death, Sieben served as chief clerk of the United States District Court for the District of Minnesota.

Family & legacy
On April 22, 1979, Sieben he suffered a stroke or a heart attack and was hospitalized. He died shortly afterwards on April 25, 1979 in Hastings.

Harry Sieben is the father of former Minnesota House of Representatives Speaker of the House and Major General and Adjutant General of the Minnesota National Guard Harry A. Sieben and state representative Mike Sieben, and the grandfather of Minnesota Senate Senator Katie Sieben. Another of Sieben's sons, William, served as an aide to Senator and later Vice President Walter Mondale. Sieben was also the brother of Major General James G. Sieben, who served as Adjutant General of the Minnesota National Guard.

References

External links 

1914 births
1979 deaths